Nusantara Kini (Nusantara Now) is an Indonesian flagship news programme which is broadcast on JPM TV. The program is broadcast for three to four hours each day through Nusantara Kini Pagi (breakfast news), Nusantara Kini Siang (lunchtime news), Nusantara Kini Petang (evening news) and Nusantara Kini Malam (night news).

Nusantara Kini is relayed simultaneously by members of the Jawa Pos Group throughout Indonesia.

References

External links 
  Nusantara TV site

Indonesian television news shows
Indonesian-language television shows
2016 Indonesian television series debuts
2010s Indonesian television series
Mass media in Indonesia stubs